The Byzantine Catholic Archeparchy of Pittsburgh is a Ruthenian Greek Catholic Church ecclesiastical territory or archeparchy of the Catholic Church that serves portions of the Eastern United States. Its territory covers the states of Alabama, Arkansas, Commonwealth of Kentucky, Louisiana, Mississippi, Commonwealth of Pennsylvania, Tennessee, Texas, and West Virginia. The current archbishop is the Most Reverend William C. Skurla, whose is resident in the archepiscopal see of Pittsburgh, Allegheny, Commonwealth of Pennsylvania.

The Archeparchy of Pittsburgh is a metropolitan see with three suffragan eparchies and one exarchate in its ecclesiastical province: the Eparchies of Parma, Passaic, Phoenix, and the Exarchate of Toronto.

History

Exarchate 
In 1924, the church had been established by the Holy See as an exarchate, known as the '"Apostolic Exarchate of Pittsburgh for Faithful of the Oriental Rite (Ruthenian)'". Exarchate is an ecclesiastical term which indicates a "missionary diocese" or territory. 
 
This move separated the Ruthenian Greek Catholic Church in the United States into two distinct groups: one for those originating from Galicia (in modern-day Ukraine) with its see in Philadelphia, Pennsylvania, and the other for those who were from the Carpathian Mountain region (in modern-day Ukraine and Slovakia), as well as those from Hungary and Croatia. In time, the two groups would come to be known as Ukrainian Greek Catholics and Ruthenian Byzantine Catholics, respectively.

(Arch)Eparchy 
The Exarchate of Pittsburgh was elevated to the status of an eparchy in 1963.

Byzantine Catholics in the United States were given sui iuris (self-governing) status as a Metropolia (archdiocese) by Pope Paul VI in 1969. Archbishop Stephen Kocisko was installed as the first Metropolitan-Archbishop on June 11, 1969, at Holy Spirit Church in Oakland (Pittsburgh). He was the first prelate in the history of people from the Subcarpathian Rus region (of present-day Ukraine and Slovakia) to hold this rank.

Operations 
The seat of the Archeparchy is the St. John the Baptist Byzantine Catholic Cathedral in Munhall, Pennsylvania, a suburb of Pittsburgh.

The Archeparchy of Pittsburgh also operates SS. Cyril and Methodius Byzantine Catholic Seminary in the North Side section of the city, for the training of candidates for the priesthood and diaconate, cantors and those in other ministries. Established in 1950 by Bishop Daniel Ivancho, the seminary serves all four eparchies of the Byzantine Catholic Metropolitan Church of Pittsburgh.

Parishes 
, the Archeparchy has 85 parishes under its canonical jurisdiction.

The majority of the archepachy's parishes are located in Western Pennsylvania, particularly in the Pittsburgh and Johnstown metropolitan areas.
 
Although most Ohio parishes are under the jurisdiction of the Byzantine Catholic Eparchy of Parma, 5 churches in metropolitan Youngstown and 5 churches in Ohio River communities are governed by the archeparchy.
 
Additionally, there are churches in the following states: Louisiana (1), Tennessee (1), Texas (4), and West Virginia (2).

Hierarchs 
The current chancery office and residency is on 66 Riverview Avenue, Pittsburgh.

 Apostolic Exarchs
 Basil Takach (1924–1948)
 Daniel Ivancho (1948–1954)

 Eparchs
 Nicholas Thomas Elko (1955–1967)

 Archeparchs
 Stephen John Kocisko (1967–1991)
 Thomas Victor Dolinay (1991–1993)
 Judson Michael Procyk (1994–2001)
 Basil Myron Schott, O.F.M. (2002–2010)
 William C. Skurla (since 2012)

 Other priests of this eparchy who became bishops
 Michael Joseph Dudick (priest here, 1945-1963), appointed Bishop of Passaic (Ruthenian) in 1968
 Emil John Mihalik, appointed Bishop of Parma (Ruthenian) in 1969
 John Michael Kudrick, appointed Bishop of Parma (Ruthenian) in 2002

See also 

 Byzantine Catholic Metropolitan Church of Pittsburgh
 Byzantine Catholic Eparchy of Parma
 Byzantine Catholic Eparchy of Passaic
 Byzantine Catholic Eparchy of Phoenix
 Byzantine Catholic Exarchate of Saints Cyril and Methodius of Toronto

References

External links 
 Ruthenian Catholic Archeparchy of Pittsburgh official site
 Metropolia of Pittsburgh
 Archeparchy of Pittsburgh (Ruthenian) (Catholic-Hierarchy.org)
 Byzantine Catholic Church in America official site

1924 establishments in Pennsylvania
Pittsburgh
Pittsburgh
Churches in Pittsburgh
Pittsburgh, Byzantine Catholic Archeparchy
Eastern Catholicism in Ohio
Eastern Catholicism in Pennsylvania
Catholicism in Texas
Catholicism in West Virginia
Christian organizations established in 1924
Pittsburgh
Rusyn-American culture in Pennsylvania
Rusyn-American culture in West Virginia
Rusyn-American history